Brooksetta is a North American genus of plant bugs in the family Miridae. There are about 13 described species in Brooksetta.

Species
These 13 species belong to the genus Brooksetta:

 Brooksetta althaeae (Hussey, 1924) (hollyhock plant bug)
 Brooksetta azteci (Knight, 1968)
 Brooksetta californiana Carvalho, 1990
 Brooksetta chelifer (Knight, 1927)
 Brooksetta ferox (Van Duzee, 1916)
 Brooksetta inconspicua (Uhler, 1893)
 Brooksetta incurva (Knight, 1927)
 Brooksetta malvastri (Knight, 1968)
 Brooksetta nevadensis (Knight, 1968)
 Brooksetta nicholi (Knight, 1927)
 Brooksetta shoshonea (Knight, 1968)
 Brooksetta tibialis (Van Duzee, 1916)
 Brooksetta viridicata (Uhler, 1895)

References

Further reading

External links

 

Miridae genera
Articles created by Qbugbot
Orthotylini